Anthony Drew Dorsett, Jr. (born September 14, 1973) is a former American football safety. He was drafted by the Houston Oilers in the sixth round of the 1996 NFL Draft. He has also been a member of the Oakland Raiders, Toronto Argonauts and Omaha Nighthawks. He played college football at Pittsburgh. He is the son of Pro Football Hall of Fame running back Tony Dorsett.

Early years
Anthony Dorsett played high school football at Pearce High School in the Dallas suburb of Richardson, Texas.

College career
Anthony Dorsett played college football at the University of Pittsburgh where he played in forty-two games, starting seventeen. Anthony Dorsett finished his college career with eighty tackles and three interceptions.

Professional career

NFL
Anthony Dorsett was drafted in the sixth round of the 1996 NFL Draft by the Houston Oilers. After four seasons with the Oilers, who became the Tennessee Titans, Anthony Dorsett joined the Oakland Raiders in 2000, playing four seasons with the team. In 1999, the Titans made it to Super Bowl XXXIV in which Anthony Dorsett started, however they lost to the Kurt Warner-led St. Louis Rams. In 2002, he also played on the Raiders team which made it to Super Bowl XXXVII in which Anthony Dorsett also started, however they lost to the Brad Johnson-quarterbacked, Warren Sapp-led Tampa Bay Buccaneers.

CFL
On June 1, 2007, Anthony Dorsett signed with the Toronto Argonauts of the Canadian Football League, but was subsequently cut in training camp on June 18, 2007.

UFL
Anthony Dorsett was signed by the Omaha Nighthawks of the United Football League in 2010.

References

1973 births
Living people
American football safeties
Houston Oilers players
Oakland Raiders players
Omaha Nighthawks players
Pittsburgh Panthers football players
Tennessee Oilers players
Tennessee Titans players
Toronto Argonauts players
American masters athletes
People from Aliquippa, Pennsylvania
Players of American football from Pennsylvania